The Loggia Valmarana located inside the Salvi gardens, also called Valmarana Salvi gardens, was probably built in 1591 by a student of Andrea Palladio by the will of Gian Luigi Valmarana himself, who wanted this place become a meeting point between intellectuals and academics.

Since 1994 it is part of the City of Vicenza and the Palladian Villas of the Veneto forming the World Heritage Site of the Unesco.

History
The gardens were opened in 1592 by Leonardo Valmarana (date and name are displayed in the Loggia Valmarana) and covered the area bounded by the extension of the Corso Palladio and the course of the Seriola Canal, ditch that since the opening was equipped with a bridge of wood that would allow crossing. Open to the public at the behest of Leonardo, they were later closed for a couple of centuries.

Inside the park, on the west side, there is also the Lombard loggia of the seventeenth century, with three arches, built by Baldassarre Longhena. In the nineteenth century the park was transformed into an English garden and, only from the following century, it was reopened to the public.

Gallery

See also
 Valmarana Chapel, in Santa Corona, designed by Andrea Palladio
 Palazzo Valmarana
 Villa Valmarana (Lisiera)
 Valmarana family

References

External links

 Città di Vicenza

Gardens in Veneto
Buildings and structures in Vicenza
Loggias in Italy